Arago is an unincorporated community in Coos County, Oregon, on the Coquille River, about  south of Coquille. The Coquille Rural Fire District provides firefighting services. The Coos County Sheriff and Myrtle Point police provide law enforcement services.

History
The Arago post office was named for Cape Arago, which in turn was named for French physicist and geographer François Arago. The previously suggested name of Halls Prairie was disapproved by postal authorities.

References

Unincorporated communities in Coos County, Oregon
Unincorporated communities in Oregon